Engaged Buddhism, also known as socially engaged Buddhism, refers to a Buddhist social movement that emerged in Asia in the 20th century, composed of Buddhists who are seeking ways to apply the Buddhist ethics, insights acquired from meditation practice, and the teachings of the Buddhist dharma to contemporary situations of social, political, environmental and economic suffering, and injustice. Finding its roots in Vietnam through the Thiền Buddhist teacher Thích Nhất Hạnh, Engaged Buddhism was popularised by the Indian jurist, politician, and social reformer B. R. Ambedkar who inspired the Dalit Buddhist movement in the 1950s, and has since grown by spreading to the Indian subcontinent and the West.

During the 1960s, the terms "engaged Buddhism" and "socially engaged Buddhism" were taken up by loosely-connected networks of Buddhists in Asia and the West to describe their adaption of Buddhist values and ethical conduct to social and political activism, which comprised a range of non-violent social and political activities such as peacemaking, promotion of human rights, environmental protection, rural development, combatting ethnic violence, opposition to warfare, and support of women's rights. With globalisation and technological advancement, engaged Buddhist organisations and efforts have spread across the globe, such as the Buddhist Peace Fellowship.

Origins 
The term "Engaged Buddhism" is often attributed to the Vietnamese Thiền Buddhist teacher Thích Nhất Hạnh in the 1950s in his collection of articles, "A Fresh Look at Buddhism". While Thích Nhất Hạnh coined the phrase, Buddhism that engages with social and political issues had already occurred throughout the world. The concept of Engaged Buddhism stemmed from a need to respond to world crises, particularly the Vietnam War. He was inspired by the humanistic Buddhism reform movement in China by Taixu and Yinshun and later propagated in Taiwan by Cheng Yen and Hsing Yun. During the Vietnam War, he and his sangha (spiritual community) made efforts to respond to the suffering they saw around them, in part by coopting the nonviolence activism of Mahatma Gandhi in India and of Reverend Martin Luther King Jr. in the United States to oppose the conflict. They saw this work as part of their meditation and mindfulness practice, not apart from it.

As early as 1946, Walpola Rahula identified an explicit social ethos present in the earliest recorded Buddhist teachings, noting that the Buddha encouraged early monks to travel in order to benefit the largest number of people and that his discourses to lay people often included practical instructions on social and economic matters, rather than being purely concerned with philosophical or soteriological concerns.

Teachings 
Engaged Buddhism applies the teachings of the Buddha to social life in order to bring about social change. Engaged Buddhists hope to connect traditional Buddhist beliefs to protest and social action. One way to view Engaged Buddhism is through Thích Nhất Hạnh's Fourteen Precepts. Thích Nhất Hạnh established The Fourteen Precepts of Engaged Buddhism, which serve as guidelines for living with a stronger social awareness. The Fourteen Precepts are as follows,1. Do not be idolatrous about or bound to any doctrine, theory, or ideology, even Buddhist ones. Buddhist systems of thought are guiding means; they are not absolute truth.

2. Do not think the knowledge you presently possess is changeless, absolute truth. Avoid being narrow minded and bound to present views. Learn and practice nonattachment from views in order to be open to receive others' viewpoints. Truth is found in life and not merely in conceptual knowledge. Be ready to learn throughout your entire life and to observe reality in yourself and in the world at all times.

3. Do not force others, including children, by any means whatsoever, to adopt your views, whether by authority, threat, money, propaganda, or even education. However, through compassionate dialogue, help others renounce fanaticism and narrow-mindedness.

4. Do not avoid suffering or close your eyes before suffering. Do not lose awareness of the existence of suffering in the life of the world. Find ways to be with those who are suffering, including personal contact, visits, images and sounds. By such means, awaken yourself and others to the reality of suffering in the world.

5. Do not accumulate wealth while millions are hungry. Do not take as the aim of your life fame, profit, wealth, or sensual pleasure. Live simply and share time, energy, and material resources with those who are in need.

6. Do not maintain anger or hatred. Learn to penetrate and transform them when they are still seeds in your consciousness. As soon as they arise, turn your attention to your breath in order to see and understand the nature of your hatred.

7. Do not lose yourself in dispersion and in your surroundings. Practice mindful breathing to come back to what is happening in the present moment. Be in touch with what is wondrous, refreshing, and healing both inside and around you. Plant seeds of joy, peace, and understanding in yourself in order to facilitate the work of transformation in the depths of your consciousness.

8. Do not utter words that can create discord and cause the community to break. Make every effort to reconcile and resolve all conflicts, however small.

9. Do not say untruthful things for the sake of personal interest or to impress people. Do not utter words that cause division and hatred. Do not spread news that you do not know to be certain. Do not criticise or condemn things of which you are not sure. Always speak truthfully and constructively. Have the courage to speak out about situations of injustice, even when doing so may threaten your own safety.

10. Do not use the Buddhist community for personal gain or profit, or transform your community into a political party. A religious community, however, should take a clear stand against oppression and injustice and should strive to change the situation without engaging in partisan conflicts.

11. Do not live with a vocation that is harmful to humans and nature. Do not invest in companies that deprive others of their chance to live. Select a vocation that helps realise your ideal of compassion.

12. Do not kill. Do not let others kill. Find whatever means possible to protect life and prevent war.

13. Possess nothing that should belong to others. Respect the property of others, but prevent others from profiting from human suffering or the suffering of other species on Earth.

14. Do not mistreat your body. Learn to handle it with respect. Do not look on your body as only an instrument. Preserve vital energies (sexual, breath, spirit) for the realisation of the Way. (For brothers and sisters who are not monks and nuns:) Sexual expression should not take place without love and commitment. In sexual relations, be aware of future suffering that may be caused. To preserve the happiness of others, respect the rights and commitments of others. Be fully aware of the responsibility of bringing new lives into the world. Meditate on the world into which you are bringing new beings.

– Thích Nhất HạnhB. R. Ambedkar also advocated for a type of Engaged Buddhism. He utilised and modified Buddhism to inspire social change and provide dignity and humanity to himself and his community. Ambedkar's principles surrounded the commitment to Liberty, Equality, and Fraternity, which stemmed from the Buddha's philosophy.

In India 
In India, a form of engaged Buddhism started as a Buddhist revival movement by B.R. Ambedkar, called Dalit Buddhist movement. Buddhist teachings invite us to take responsibility for ourselves, and this is being interpreted in engaged Buddhist circles as taking responsibility for the entire sangha, the larger community, and ultimately, our ecosystem on this planet Earth. Ambedkar's approach tells us that if we spend too much time in personal meditation practice, and in retreat from the world of social relationship, we will be irresponsible to our community. So we need to get off the cushion, get out of the house, get out there and start to educate, agitate, and organise. This is a collectivist notion of sangha as people working together for a society of justice, wherein our Buddhist practice becomes the engaged activity of social change. According to Christopher Queen : "Ambedkar offered a socially engaged Buddhism that focused on economic justice, political freedom, and moral striving". B.R. Ambedkar converted to Buddhism in 1956 and initiated what is called Ambedkar Buddhism, when on October 1956 in Nagpur, nearly 400,000 Dalits converted from Hinduism. His book The Buddha and His Dhamma was published in 1957, after his death.

Socially engaged Buddhism in the West 
In the West, like the East, engaged Buddhism is a way of attempting to link authentic Buddhist practice—particularly mindfulness—with social action. It has two main centers from which its approach, spearheaded by Thich Nhat Hanh, is disseminated, namely the Plum Village monastic community in Loubes-Bernac, France and the Community of Mindful Living (CML) in Berkeley, California. Both centers are tied to Hanh's Unified Buddhist Church. Beside Hanh's efforts, the current Dalai Lama has voiced a need for Buddhists to be more involved in the socio-political realm: 

Many organisations were established in order to help build the movement of engaged Buddhists. These organisations include the Soka Gakkai International, Buddhist Peace Fellowship, Buddhist Global Relief, the International Network of Engaged Buddhists, the Zen Peacemakers, and the Order of Interbeing. Other engaged Buddhist groups include the Benevolent Organisation for Development, Health and Insight, Gaden Relief Projects, the UK's Network of Buddhist Organisations, Fo Guang Shan and Tzu Chi.

The School of Youth for Social Service (SYSS) was established by Thích Nhất Hạnh in 1964. The school focused on training social workers through the teachings of Engaged Buddhism. Members of the school helped relieve suffering and rebuild villages to those affected by the Vietnam War.

Prominent figures in the movement include Robert Aitken Roshi, Joanna Macy, Gary Snyder, Alan Senauke, Sulak Sivaraksa, Daisaku Ikeda, Maha Ghosananda, Sylvia Wetzel, Joan Halifax, Tara Brach, Taigen Dan Leighton, Ken Jones, Jan Willis, Bhante Sujato and Bhikkhu Bodhi. and Ajahn Buddhadasa.

See also 
 Buddhist ethics
 Buddhist Peace Fellowship
 Buddhist socialism
 Dhammayietra
 Engaged spirituality
 Humanistic Buddhism
 Religion and environmentalism in Buddhism
 Religion and peacebuilding

References

Further reading 
 Fuller, Paul. 2021. An Introduction to Engaged Buddhism. London: Bloomsbury.
 Main, Jessica L., and Rongdao Lai. "Introduction: Reformulating "Socially Engaged Buddhism" as an Analytical Category." The Eastern Buddhist, NEW SERIES, 44, no. 2 (2013): 1–34. 
 Visalo, Phra Paisal. Buddhists Engaged in Social Development.
 Visalo, Phra Paisal. The Path to Social and Inner Happiness.

External links

Engaged Practice
Buddhist Peace Fellowship
Zen Peacemakers
International Network of Engaged Buddhists
Engaged Buddhist Revival in India
Ecodharma Centre
Network of Buddhist Organisations (UK)
Amida Trust Home Page
Sulak Sivaraksa: A Socially Engaged Buddhism
The Engaged Zen Foundation
Buddhist Global Relief
Benevolent Organisation for Development, Health and Insight
Gaden Relief Projects
Sakyadhita International Association of Buddhist Women
Buddhist Compassion Relief Tzu Chi Foundation

 
Plum Village Tradition